The following is a list of parishes in the Roman Catholic Archdiocese of Washington.

Montgomery County 
Parishes of the archdiocese located in Montgomery County, Maryland.

Upper Montgomery East Deanery

Upper Montgomery West Deanery

Middle Montgomery County Deanery

Lower Montgomery County Deanery

Prince George’s County 
Parishes of the archdiocese located in Prince George's County, Maryland.

Upper Prince George’s County Deanery

Middle Prince George’s County Deanery

Lower Prince George’s County Deanery

Southern Maryland 
Parishes of the archdiocese located in Calvert County, Charles County, and St. Mary's County of Southern Maryland.

Calvert County Deanery

Charles County Deanery

St. Mary’s County Deanery

Washington, D.C. 
Parishes of the archdiocese located in Washington, D.C.

Northwest-East Deanery

Northwest-West Deanery

Northeast Deanery

Southeast Deanery

References

External links
 Complete Directory of the Archdiocese of Washington

 
W